Piotr Trafarski (born May 8, 1983 in Kętrzyn) is a Polish footballer.

External links 
 

1983 births
Living people
Polish footballers
People from Kętrzyn
Sportspeople from Warmian-Masurian Voivodeship
Association football forwards
Jeziorak Iława players
Olimpia Elbląg players
Lechia Gdańsk players
Bruk-Bet Termalica Nieciecza players